Rohatec is a municipality and village in Hodonín District in the South Moravian Region of the Czech Republic. It has about 3,400 inhabitants.

History
The first written mention of Rohatec is from 1270.

Notable people
Zdeněk Škromach (born 1956), politician; lives here
Jakub Kornfeil (born 1993), motorcycle racer; lives here

References

Villages in Hodonín District
Moravian Slovakia